Thomas Hazelton (born 22 January 1999) is an Australian professional rugby league footballer who plays as a  for the Cronulla-Sutherland Sharks in the NRL.

Background
Hazelton grew up in Goulburn and played his junior rugby league for the Goulburn Bulldogs.

Career

2022
Hazelton made his first grade debut for Cronulla against the Sydney Roosters in (Indigenous Round) round 12 of the 2022 NRL season, in a 36-16 loss and became Cronulla player number 552.
In 2019 Hazelton became a life member of one of the worlds most prestigious Clubs: Flamingos Goulburn

Statistics

NRL
 Statistics are correct as of the end of the 2022 season

References

External links
Cronulla Sharks profile

1999 births
Living people
Australian rugby league players
Cronulla-Sutherland Sharks players
Newtown Jets NSW Cup players
Rugby league players from Goulburn, New South Wales
Rugby league props